Dario J. Frommer (born October 22, 1963, in Long Beach, California) is a former member of the California State Assembly for the 43rd district who served from 2000 until 2006. He served as Majority Leader from 2004 until 2006. Frommer also served as Chair of the Health Committee. He is now a partner with Akin Gump Strauss Hauer & Feld LLP in Los Angeles.

Children 
Frommer has one son Dario A. P. Frommer

References

External links
Join California Dario Frommer

1963 births
Living people
People from Long Beach, California
Democratic Party members of the California State Assembly
University of California, Davis alumni
21st-century American politicians